UKM Bangi Stadium is a small stadium located at Bangi, Selangor, Malaysia. Its capacity is 500. The stadium is built for Universiti Kebangsaan Malaysia and the UKM F.C. team. Real Mulia F.C. is the other tenant that also use the stadium. It is sometimes used for football matches from the local team. It can also be used as a rugby pitch. Activities made by the university are sometimes held in the stadium.

See also
 Sport in Malaysia

External links
 UKM Bangi Sport Centre
 UKM Bangi Stadium's Location
 Point of interest nearby UKM Bangi Stadium

Football venues in Malaysia
Rugby union stadiums in Malaysia
Athletics (track and field) venues in Malaysia
Multi-purpose stadiums in Malaysia
Sports venues in Selangor
National University of Malaysia
Cricket grounds in Malaysia